Prophecy is the first release from London-based band The Comet Is Coming. It was released by The Leaf Label digitally and as a 12" vinyl EP on 20 November 2015.

Background
In an interview, saxophonist Shabaka Hutchings states that the music for Prophecy began out of jam sessions with Dan Leavers on synths and keys and Maxwell Hallett on drums.
The band elaborate on this in an interview with The Quietus, saying how the music was composed in the studio whilst recording in a three-day session. They invited friends and guests into the studio, "referencing Parliament and Funkadelic and the way they recorded, with like a party going on in the studio".
"Neon Baby" was initially released as a digital single accompanied by a music video featuring imagery from science fiction and B-movies, which can also be seen in the titles of the tracks on Prophecy. A music video for "Do The Milky Way" was released along with the album, premiering on The Quietus

Track listing
All tracks written by King Shabaka, Danalogue the Conqueror and Betamax Killer, except "Final Days Of The Apocalypse" written by King Shabaka, Danalogue the Conqueror, Betamax Killer and Joshua Idehen.

 "Neon Baby" – 3:42
 "Star Exploding in Slow Motion" – 6:41
 "Do the Milky Way" - 3:07
 "Cosmic Serpent" - 2:58
 "Final Days of the Apocalypse" - 2:30

Personnel
The Comet Is Coming
 King Shabaka (Shabaka Hutchings) – tenor saxophone
 Danalogue The Conqueror (Dan Leavers) - keyboards and synthesisers
 Betamax Killer (Maxwell Hallett) – drums

Additional musicians
 Joshua Idehen – spoken word (5)
 Capitol K - percussion (3)

References

External links
 Do The Milky Way video
 Neon Baby video

2015 EPs
The Comet Is Coming albums
The Leaf Label albums